The 1973 Gloucester City Council election took place on 5 May 1973 to elect members of Gloucester City Council in England.

Results 

|}

Ward results

Barnwood

Barton

Eastgate

Hucclecote

Kingsholm

Linden

Longlevens

Matson

Podsmead

Tuffley

Westgate

References

1973 English local elections
1973
1970s in Gloucestershire